Isaac Spackman (died 7 January 1771) was an English painter. He practised about the middle of the eighteenth century, and is best known as a painter of birds and animals. Spackman died in Islington.

References

1771 deaths
18th-century English painters
English male painters
18th-century English male artists